Brad Green may refer to:

 Brad Green (footballer) (born 1981), Australian rules footballer with the Melbourne Demons
 Brad Green (politician) (born 1965), former Minister of Health and Attorney General of New Brunswick, Canada
 Braddon Green (born 1959), first-class cricketer for Victoria and Devon

See also
 Bradley Green (disambiguation)